AmaZulu Football Club (Simply often known as AmaZulu) is a South African professional soccer club based in the city of Durban in the KwaZulu Natal province, that plays in the Premier Soccer League the first-tier of South African football league system. The club's nickname, Usuthu, is a Zulu war cry.

History

Early history (1932–1973)
One of the oldest clubs in South Africa, AmaZulu was formed by Zulu migrant workers in 1932 and originally named Zulu Royal Conquerors. The club was then introduced to then Zulu king Solomon, who changed the team's name to Zulu Royals, their colours to royal blue and white, and also introduced the shield to their logo.

Initially Prince Bayisikili was placed as the team guardian at eMsizini and later replaced by Prince Sithela and the team's headquarter was at the  Royal Kraal by then the team colours had changed to bottle green and white. On the day of King Bhekizulu's funeral in the year 1968, the team went to play a Cup game against SAPPI Homestars at eMandeni, which they lost 4–2. On the day of the funeral the club was supposed to escort the King's coffin but Mr. Shezi, Mr. Nsele, Mr. Magwaza ended up escorting the King wearing the team's uniform.

After that game an argument had broken up between the supporters of the club because some of them including Prince Sithela criticized the fact that, how could the team play a game on the day of the funeral of the Zulu King, when the team was supposed to mourn the King's death.

At the end of 1970 the remaining committee members consisting of Mr Mkhize and Mr Ralph Mabaso decided to rebuild the team from scratch, recruited players, acquired a kit and appointed Mr Bethuel Masondo as the team manager. The committee went on to register the club as Zulu Royals United and Mr. Bethuel Masondo was the sole director. They decided to take the team back to eMbelebeleni Royal Kraal as its headquarters.

In 1971 a team called African Wanderers which was located in Kwa-Zulu Natal were experiencing problems while playing in the National Professional League (NPSL) which led the NPSL to take a decision that the Kwa-Zulu Natal Football Association must suspend African Wanderers from the NPSL and then recommend another team from Kwa-Zulu Natal to replace them. The Kwa-Zulu Natal Football Association then recommended the following teams: Union Jacks, Durban City All Black, Zulu Royals United or Young Dribblers.

The National Professional Soccer League (NPSL) at that time chairman, Mr RD Sishi, decided that Zulu Royal's United must replace African Wanderers in the NPSL because Zulu Royals was a team which represented the Zulu Nation from the Royal Kraal and that it has a support base more than the clubs that were recommended.

In 1971 Zulu Royals replaced African Wanderers and went on to finish 6th on the log and were voted club of the year. The following year in 1972 the club won the N.P.S.L league title securing 44 points from 26 matches and only losing 2 games.

In 1973 Zulu Royal suffered a huge set back when the then manager Mr. Bethwell Masondo left the club and took with him several prominent players which split the club. After this unfortunate incident the club went into a mid-season slump that would see them not being able to successful defend their league title. In 1974, the running of the club was taken over by the supporters and in the same year, the team changed to AmaZulu Football Club. Some supporters led by Mr. Francis Dlamini who managed the reserve team decided to part ways with the reserve team to Bhekizulu hall and renamed back Zulu Royals United and its nickname were esikotshi". Other Directors that followed were Mr, Manana and Mr. Nxumalo who bought the team for R 4000.00, Mr. Merikan Madlala from Lamontville, then followed a committee made of Mr. Ngongoma, Mr. Duma, Mr. Mathe, Mr. Dlamini, Mr. Biyela and Nhleko.

The formation of the NSL and name changes (1985–2002)

In 1985 the National Soccer League was formed and AmaZulu entered a new phase of their history under the leadership of Mr. David Dlamini. In 1987, Clive Barker coached AmaZulu FC to finals of mainstay Cup and Iwisa Charity Cup, where they were narrowly defeated twice by Kaizer Chiefs. In 1990 the club reached the Bob Save Super Bowl final which they lost with a last minute goal against Jomo Cosmos, in 1992 the club won the inauguration Coca-Cola Cup and finished 3rd on the log in 1993.

After Mr. Dlamini then followed Spar Natal, Mr. Ncanana, Mr. Dan Naidoo, Mr. Mike Segal, Mr. Dave King after him was Mr Sisa Bikisha in 2002, who then changed the name AmaZulu F.C to Zulu Royal.

Sokhela ownership (2005–2020)

In 2005, Dr Patrick Sokhela bought the team from Mr Sisa Bikisha, decided to revive the once mighty outfit of the Zulus by renaming the team back to AmaZulu Football Club. He and immediately bought the Premier Soccer League status of Dynamos to return the club to the top flight. To commemorate the club's 80th anniversary in 2012 AmaZulu played a friendly against English giants Manchester United on 18 July 2012 losing by a solitary goal scored by Federico Macheda.

AmaZulu was relegated in the 2014–15 season. After a failure to be promoted in the 2016–17 season they rejoined the Premier Soccer League by purchasing the Thanda Royal Zulu's Premier Soccer League Status.

After purchasing their PSL status, the team finished 7th in the 2017–18 season, however they were stripped of the Top 8 finish when Ajax Cape Town fielded Tendai Ndoro in matches against Platinum Stars, Polokwane City & Supersport United. This resulted in Ajax Cape Town losing all three matches 3–0 & fined R50 000 on each offence, and AmaZulu dropping to 9th position in the 2017–18 season.

On 28 September 2018 it was announced by the PSL that AmaZulu would be docked 6 points for failure to comply with a ruling made by the Court of Arbitration for Sport in September 2017. The matter surrounded the illegal termination of the contract of a former player, Phinheas Nambandi, in 2014 Nambandi took the club to FIFA to contest the termination of his contract, with FIFA ruling that the termination was illegal and that the club were to pay an amount of R1‚086,000.00. AmaZulu appealed the decision at the Court of Arbitration for Sport, however, the decision was upheld. A year later the club had still failed to pay the outstanding figure to Phinheas Nambandi, this resulted in FIFA's Disciplinary Committee ruling that should the club not settle the debt with the player by 16 September 2018, 6 points would be deducted.

The club had a turbulent 2019–20 season, with two coaches being fired and the club's PSL status secured by the coaching combination of Ayanda Dlamini and Moeneeb Josephs. AmaZulu started the season poorly under Cavin Johnson and his assistant Alan Clark, with the team sitting on 2 points after 5 games. The decision was made by club management to fire the coaching duo, with Jozef Vukusic coming in as the club's new head coach. The team seemed to have turned a corner under Vukusic's mentorship, however, they started the second half of the season poorly and it was decided that change was needed in order to save the club from relegation. Vukusic was suspended, with assistant coach Ayanda Dlamini being given the role as interim head coach, and Moeneeb Josephs being installed as his assistant. Dlamini managed to save the club from relegation, with the team finishing 13th, and going undefeated in his 5 home games in charge. What made this achievement even more impressive is that the AmaZulu ownership had implemented salary cuts on all their staff, which they cited as being associated with the COVID-19 pandemic – this despite the fact that the club continued to receive its full monthly grant from the PSL. The club received backlash for the manner in which the salary cuts were handled from the SA Football Players' Union.

The Zungu era (2020–present)

On 2 October 2020, it was announced that businessman Sandile Zungu had purchased AmaZulu from Patrick Sokhela. From the outset, the new ownership laid out a 12-year plan that would see the club climb in stock and standing within South African football. As part of achieving this plan, Zungu brought in Benni McCarthy as Head Coach, with Siyabonga Nomvethe and McCarthy's former assistant from Cape Town City, Vasili Manousakis joining the club as assistant coaches – this saw the redeployment of Ayanda Dlamini to the club youth structures and the mutual termination of Allan Freese's contract. Further to this, Moeneeb Josephs was brought in as the new first team goalkeeper coach, replacing long term employee Davies Phiri; and, Justin Hamburger was brought in to join the Performance Analysis department alongside Pilela Maposa.

In his maiden season as the owner of AmaZulu, Sandile Zungu saw his team finish 2nd behind Mamelodi Sundowns and subsequently qualify for the 1st preliminary round of the CAF Champions League. The team beat Nyasa Big Bullets in the preliminary round with a 3-2 aggregate. AmaZulu progressed to the 2nd preliminary round facing African giants, TP Mazembe, with AmaZulu qualifying for the group stages of the competition after a 1-1 aggregate, going through on away goals. AmaZulu are the seventh team from South Africa to progress beyond the preliminary stages of Africa's showpiece club competition.

Facilities
The club currently train and have their administrative offices at Moses Mabhida Stadium. The technical team have their offices based inside Prime Human Performance Institute. The club also utilizes the performance facilities at Prime.

The club plays their home games out of Moses Mabhida Stadium, which is based in Durban.

Tertiary Institution Cooperation
The High-Performance Manager of AmaZulu, Joshua Smith, played a key role in the formation of an externship program with the University of KwaZulu-Natal Biokinetics, Sports and Leisure Science department in 2019. The link sees biokinetics and exercise science honours students from the university assist with AmaZulu youth training sessions and physical testing. The link between the two organisations enters its 4th year in 2022.

Further to their link with UKZN, it was announced on 15 December 2020 by AmaZulu's High-Performance Manager, Joshua Smith, that a formal link between Usuthu and the International Soccer Science and Performance Federation (ISSPF) had been finalized, with the ISSPF becoming the official educational partner of the team.

Personnel

Club officials

Senior team staff

Academy staff

Head coach history

Club honours

League
National Professional Soccer League (first tier)
Champions: 1972

First Division Coastal Stream (second tier)
Winners: 2000–01, 2002–03

Cups
MTN 8
Runners-up: 2022Telkom KnockoutWinners: 1992Nedbank Cup'''
Runners-up: 1972, 1973, 1974, 1987, 1990, 2009–10

Minor cups
 KwaZulu-Natal Premier's Cup:
 Winners: 2018
The Msunduzi Cup
 Winners: 2019

Club records
 Most starts:  Julius Chirwa 244
 Most goals:  Owen Nzimande 55
 Most capped player:  Francis Shonhai 13
 Most starts in a season:  Archie Radebe 41 (1987)
 Most goals in a season:  George Dearnaley 23 (1992)
 Record defeat: 1–8 vs  SuperSport United (6/6/04, PSL)
 Most points in a league season: 54 (2020/2021)
 Most wins in a row: 6 (2020/2021)
 Longest undefeated run: 16 (2020/2021)

Premier Soccer League
2021/2022  – 7th
2020/2021  – 2nd
2019/2020  – 13th
 2018/2019  – 11th
 2017/2018  – 9th
 2014/2015  – 16th (relegated)
 2013/2014  – 9th
 2012/2013  – 12th
 2011/2012  – 7th
 2010/2011  – 14th
 2009/2010  – 9th
 2008/2009  – 8th
 2007/2008  – 13th
 2006/2007  – 15th
 2003/2004  – 16th (relegated)
 2001/2002  – 17th (relegated)
 1999/2000  – 17th (relegated)
 1998/1999  – 14th
 1997/1998  – 15th
 1996/1997  – 14th

National First Division (2nd tier)
 2016/2017  – 5th
 2015/2016  – 9th
 2005/2006  – 8th
 2004/2005  – 6th
 2002/2003  – 1st (promoted)
 2000/2001  – 1st (promoted)

CAF Champions League
 2021/2022 - Qualified for group stages.

Cup record

MTN 8

Carling Black Label Cup

Telkom Knockout

Nedbank Cup

Current squad

Players on loan

Shirt sponsor and kit manufacturer
Shirt sponsor: SPAR
Kit manufacturer: Umbro
Sponsor: Durban Tourism
Sponsor: Grindrod
Sponsor:Thule
Sponsor: Mazi Asset Management
Vehicle Sponsor: Mitsubishi South Africa 
Strapping and Rehabilitation equipment: HiTech Therapy

References

External links
 
 Premier Soccer League

 
Association football clubs established in 1932
Premier Soccer League clubs
Soccer clubs in Durban
1932 establishments in South Africa
National First Division clubs